The 2008 Artistic Gymnastics World Cup Final was held in Madrid, Spain in December 2008. This was the last Artistic Gymnastics World Cup in which a Final event was held.

Medal summary

Women's results

Uneven bars

Balance beam

Floor exercise

References

See also
 List of medalists at the FIG World Cup Final

2008
Artistic Gymnastics World Cup
International gymnastics competitions hosted by Spain
2008 in Spanish sport